Pongtep Mulalee (born November 4, 1988) is a professional footballer from Thailand. He currently plays for Udon Thani in the Thai League 3.

Club career

Honours

Club
Prachinburi 
Thai Division 2 League Champions (1) : 2008

External links
 Facebook of Pongtep
 
 performance of Pongtep youTube

1988 births
Living people
Pongtep Mulalee
Pongtep Mulalee
Association football midfielders
Pongtep Mulalee
Pongtep Mulalee
Pongtep Mulalee
Pongtep Mulalee
Pongtep Mulalee
Pongtep Mulalee
Pongtep Mulalee